Lappanella is a genus of wrasses native to the eastern Atlantic Ocean and the Mediterranean Sea.

Species
The currently recognized species in this genus are:
 Lappanella fasciata (Cocco, 1833)
 Lappanella guineensis Bauchot, 1969

References

 
Labridae
Marine fish genera
Taxa named by David Starr Jordan